Lemhi National Forest was established as the Lemhi Forest Reserve by the U.S. Forest Service in Idaho on November 5, 1906 with .  It became a National Forest on March 4, 1907. On October 8, 1938 the entire forest was divided between Challis National Forest and Salmon National Forest and the name was discontinued.

References

External links
Forest History Society
Forest History Society:Listing of the National Forests of the United States Text from Davis, Richard C., ed. Encyclopedia of American Forest and Conservation History. New York: Macmillan Publishing Company for the Forest History Society, 1983. Vol. II, pp. 743-788.

Former National Forests of Idaho